A nanomechanical resonator is a nanoelectromechanical systems ultra-small resonator that oscillates at a specific frequency depending on its mass and stiffness.

See also
Quartz crystal microbalance
Atomic force microscopy

References

Further reading

Nanoelectronics